Mick Garrett (born 1937 in Scotstown, County Monaghan) is an Irish former sportsperson. He played Gaelic football with his local club Tuam Stars winning 7 county titles with them and was a member of the Galway senior inter-county team from 1959 until 1965. Mick Garrett was born in 1937 in Scotstown, County Monaghan

References

1937 births
Living people
Galway inter-county Gaelic footballers
Tuam Stars Gaelic footballers